In mathematics, Gowers' theorem, also known as Gowers' Ramsey theorem and Gowers' FINk theorem, is a theorem in Ramsey theory and combinatorics. It is a Ramsey-theoretic result about functions with finite support. Timothy Gowers originally proved the result in 1992, motivated by a problem regarding Banach spaces. The result was subsequently generalised by Bartošová, Kwiatkowska, and Lupini.

Definitions 
The presentation and notation is taken from Todorčević, and is different to that originally given by Gowers.

Given , let  be the set

 

If ,  have disjoint supports, we define  to be their pointwise sum, where . Each  is a partial semigroup under .

The tetris operation  is defined . Intuitively, if  is represented as a pile of square blocks, where the th column has height , then  is the result of removing the bottom row.

The theorem 
Note that, for a block sequence , numbers  and indices , the sum  is always defined.

The standard proof uses ultrafilters, or equivalently, nonstandard arithmetic.

Generalisation 
Intuitively, the tetris operation can be seen as removing the bottom row of a pile of boxes. It is natural to ask what would happen if we tried removing different rows. Bartošová and Kwiatkowska considered the wider class of generalised tetris operations, where we can remove any chosen subset of the rows.

Formally, let  be a nondecreasing surjection. In this language, the original tetris operation is induced by the map .

Bartošová and Kwiatkowska showed that the finite version of Gowers' theorem holds for the collection of generalised tetris operations. Lupini later extended this result to the infinite case.

References 

Ramsey theory
Combinatorics